Abilene High School may refer to:

Abilene High School (Kansas), Abilene, Kansas
Abilene High School (Texas), Abilene, Texas